Thermoanaerobaculum aquaticum is a species of Acidobacteriota.

References

Bacteria described in 2013
Acidobacteriota